Peter Bradshaw (born 19 June 1962) is a British writer and film critic. He has been chief film critic at The Guardian since 1999, and is a contributing editor at Esquire.

Early life and education 
Bradshaw was educated at Haberdashers' Aske's Boys' School in Hertfordshire and studied English at Pembroke College, Cambridge, where he was president of the Cambridge Footlights. He was awarded a Bachelor of Arts degree in 1984, followed by postgraduate research in the Early Modern period in which he studied with Lisa Jardine and Anne Barton. He received his PhD in 1989.

Career 
In the 1990s, Bradshaw was employed by the Evening Standard as a columnist, and during the 1997 general election campaign, editor Max Hastings asked him to write a series of parodic diary entries purporting to be written by the Conservative MP and historian Alan Clark, which Clark thought deceptive and which were the subject of a court case resolved in January 1998, the first in newspaper history in which the subject of a satire sued its author. Bradshaw was not put into the witness box by his QC Peter Prescott, and the judge Gavin Lightman found in Clark's favour, granting an injunction, deciding that Bradshaw's articles were then being published in a form that "a substantial number of readers" would believe they were genuinely being written by Alan Clark. Bradshaw found it "the most bizarre and surreal business of my professional life. I'm very flattered that Mr Clark should go to all this trouble and expense in suing me like this."

Since 1999, Bradshaw has been chief film critic for The Guardian, writing a weekly review column every Friday for the paper's Film&Music section. He is a regular guest reviewer on the Film... programme broadcast on BBC One. 

He wrote and performed a BBC Radio 4 programme entitled For One Horrible Moment, recorded on 10 October 1998 and first broadcast on 20 January 1999, which chronicled a young man's coming of age in 1970s Cambridgeshire. His bittersweet short story Reunion, first broadcast on BBC Radio 4 on 21 October 2016, was narrated by Tom Hollander and described as "sad and sly, and connected impermeably to the mid-Seventies and what it felt like to be young". Another short story, entitled Neighbours Of Zero, first broadcast on Radio 4 on 17 November 2017, was narrated by Daniel Mays. Bradshaw's story Senior Moment, first broadcast on Radio 4 on 22 May 2020, was narrated by Michael Maloney. Bradshaw co-wrote and acted in David Baddiel's sitcom Baddiel's Syndrome, first aired on Sky One.

Favorite films 
In a 2022 Sight & Sound poll of cinema's greatest films, Bradshaw indicated his ten favourites are:

 The Addiction (USA, 1994)
 Boyhood (2014 film) (USA, 2014) 
 Annie Hall (USA, 1977)
 Black Narcissus (UK, 1947)
 Zama (film) (Argentina, 2017)
 Vagabond (1985 film) (France, 1985)
 In the Mood for Love (China, 2000)
 Kind Hearts and Coronets (UK, 1949)
 Raging Bull (USA, 1980)
 Singin' in the Rain (USA, 1952)

Awards 
Bradshaw has been shortlisted four times at The Press Awards in the Critic of the Year category, in 2001, 2007, 2013 and 2014, "Highly Commended" the last time.

References 

1962 births
21st-century British short story writers
Alumni of Pembroke College, Cambridge
British male short story writers
English film critics
English male journalists
English male non-fiction writers
Living people
People educated at Haberdashers' Boys' School
The Guardian journalists